The David Brown Mini Remastered is a city car produced by the British car manufacturer David Brown Automotive. It was unveiled in April 2017 at the Top Marques in Monaco. The vehicle is a remastering of the original Mini built between 1959 and 2000.

Equipment 
In contrast to the sparingly equipped original Mini, the Mini Remastered features electric power-assisted steering, air conditioning, electric start/stop button, remote central locking, full LED lighting and a 7-inch touchscreen infotainment system with Apple® CarPlay®, satellite navigation, 3G, 4G, Bluetooth® and DAB connectivity. In addition, the vehicle is available in twelve exterior colours and three for the roof.

The Mini Remastered is available globally in both left-hand and right-hand drive.

Engines 
The Mini Remastered is powered by a 1275cc A-Series engine, except for the Monte Carlo edition, which uses a 1330cc version.

Special models 

The Mini Remastered also offers two limited-production special editions, the Mini Remastered, Inspired by Café Racers, taking inspiration from the classic 1950's motorbike movement, and Mini Remastered, Inspired by Monte Carlo, taking inspiration from the racing heritage of the classic Mini on which the cars are based. Both special editions are limited to just 25 examples.

References 

Mini Remastered
Cars introduced in 2017